Norm Benning Racing is an American professional stock car racing team that currently competes part-time in the NASCAR Camping World Truck Series. The team is owned by Norm Benning, who drives the No. 6 Chevrolet Silverado.

History 
Norm Benning Racing opened in 1993, DNQ'ing all attempts by team owner Norm Benning in Cup competition. Benning began fielding the No. 8 and 84 car in the ARCA Racing Series in 1995 for himself and other drivers. Benning ran the team in four Nationwide races from 2003–2004. The team's most successful series has been the Truck Series, after successfully making 7 of the 8 races they attempted in 2008. The team ran the full Truck season making 24 of the 25 races and finishing 21st in points. Benning once again attempted the Daytona 500 in 2010 but failed to qualify. The team attempted to race the 2010 Truck season full-time in the No. 57 and had a good degree of success, gaining locked-in for a few races in owner points. For 2011 the team struggled to make some races early in the year. Later on, the team began fielding a second truck, the No. 75 starting at Iowa. In 2012, the team again had problems with qualifying for some events but finished 21st in points. In 2013, Benning made all but one race, and gained national notoriety after his battle during the Last Chance Qualifier for the inaugural Mudsummer Classic at Eldora Speedway, barely finishing in the final transfer position over Clay Greenfield. Benning finished 20th in points. 2014 saw the team make all 22 races.

Sponsorship and number 
The team has had little success in finding sponsorship. They mainly function on week-by-week deals with several different companies. However, there is currently an ongoing fundraiser that is attempting to help the Facebook page NASCAR Memes sponsor Benning's No. 6 for the 2014 Talladega race.

In the past few years, Benning has raced the No. 57 in all races he enters under the Norm Benning Racing banner. Starting in the second half of 2014, Norm Benning Racing will field the No. 6 instead of 57. The former 75 is now running as the 57 with multiple drivers.

Car/truck history

ARCA
Norm Benning Racing began fielding the No. 8 and No. 84 in the ARCA Racing Series in 1995. Team Owner Norm Benning was the primary driver, with other drivers filling out the other seat.

NASCAR
Benning began fielding his equipment in NASCAR in the late 1980s, finding very little success because of lacking sponsorship and mediocre equipment. Benning attempted just about every Daytona 500 from 1994 to most recently in 2011 and was not successful in qualifying, whether it was due to mechanical failures, not transferring in through the duels, or being forced to withdraw from the race because his car did not meet minimum speed.

No. 6 History

Since 2008, Norm Benning Racing has fielded a truck. Beginning in 2009, Norm has run the full schedule despite having poor performing equipment and little to no funding. Beginning in 2011, Norm began fielding a second truck on a part-time basis to help fund the 57. In the 2013 Mudsummer Classic, Norm Benning and his team gained media attention when he beat Clay Greenfield to qualify in the 30th position. Midway through 2014, Norm changed his iconic 57 to the number 6 on his truck. The 2015 season began on a high note as Benning finished 14th at Daytona. However, the remainder of the season would prove to be very difficult. Lack of sponsorship would force Benning to do several start and parks. Towards the end of the season, the 6 began missing races as the poor finishes left the team ranking lower in points, plus the fields being cut from 36 to 32 trucks. 2016 would be a disastrous season, as the team failed to make any of the first 8 races. Midway through the season, Benning struck a deal with MB Motorsports to run the 63. Benning would run 7 races in the 63 and 1 race in the. 6, while missing 12, and not entering 1. Once again, 2017 began on a low note. After missing the first 3 races of the season, Benning was able to make the 4th race of the season at Kansas. Benning would also strike a deal with GMS Racing, purchasing the owner points from the 24 team, locking him into all the remaining races. In 2018, Benning would again return and was running in the top 10 at Daytona, but a fuel pump issue resulted in a 14th place finish. Benning's next highlight would come at Eldora, where he would have a strong run in his heat race. In the closing laps of the main event, Benning would be involved in an accident that saw the driver's side door ripped off the car. Benning missed the season opener at Daytona for the sixth time in 2019. However, he managed to finish 17th at Texas Motor Speedway and got another top 20 at Talladega Superspeedway. In 2020, Benning missed the first three races he attempted. For the first time since 2008, he didn’t finish in the top 20 a single time, with his best finish being a 22nd at Talladega Superspeedway. Benning elected to run full-time in 2021. He did not qualify at Daytona for the third straight year in a row. During the Spring Kansas weekend, the team's truck used for pulling the hauler was stolen from the hotel parking lot where they were staying. Benning attempted just 4 races in 2022 but they did not qualify for any of them.

Truck No. 6 results

No. 57 History

The 57 team debuted as the number 75, which NBR shared with Henderson Motorsports in 2011. The first race run by the team was with Mike Harmon behind the wheel. Harmon started and finished 33rd, parking the car after 6 laps. The truck ran sporadically throughout the season, driven by Johnny Borneman III, J. J. Yeley, Bobby Santos III, and James Hylton made his truck series debut at the age of 76 at Pocono. The team only ran twice in 2012, 4 times in 2013, and 6 times in 2014, although the team only ran one race as the 75. The team ran one race with the number 71, as the Henderson team had the 75 entered. After Benning switched to the 6, the 75 became the 57. The 57 made its lone appearance at Gateway in 2015, parking after one lap with Joey Gattina. Steve Fox withdrew at Pocono. After not running in 2016, the 57 returned exactly two years after its previous race at Gateway in 2017 with Tommy Regan driving. BJ McLeod and J. J. Yeley ran the 57 before Mike Senica became the primary driver. Senica announced that he was to drive the 57 fielded by Benning with several different companies sponsoring the truck, however, Benning and Senica couldn't reach an agreement because Benning only wanted Senica to start and park the 57. The 57 then showed up at Martinsville with Jeff Zillweger behind the wheel. The 57 would withdraw after not showing enough speed to have a good chance of qualifying.

Truck No. 57 results

References

External links
 
 

NASCAR teams
ARCA Menards Series teams